Hypericum haplophylloides is a species of flowering plant in the family Hypericaceae which is endemic to Albania.

References 

haplophylloides
Flora of Albania
Endemic flora of Albania